The Preston Hall in Waitsburg, Washington is a three-story Classical Revival building that was built as a school building in 1913. It was designed by Walla Walla architects Osterman & Siebert.

The building cost $30,000 and equipping it cost another $5,000.  It was funded by William G. Preston, a successful businessman who was Waitsburg's first mayor.

It was listed on the U.S. National Register of Historic Places in 1993.

References

External links

Buildings and structures completed in 1913
History of Walla Walla County, Washington
National Register of Historic Places in Walla Walla County, Washington
Neoclassical architecture in Washington (state)
Buildings and structures in Walla Walla County, Washington
School buildings on the National Register of Historic Places in Washington (state)
1913 establishments in Washington (state)